Laurence Curran Hodgson (November 6, 1874 – March 24, 1937) was an American newspaper journalist, poet, and politician from Saint Paul, Minnesota.

Biography
Hodgson was a newspaper reporter and columnist, writing at different times for the Minneapolis Times and the St. Paul Dispatch-Pioneer Press. He had a column that appeared daily on the back page of the Dispatch called "Cabbages and Kings," a reference to Lewis Carroll's poem, "The Walrus and the Carpenter."

He commonly wrote under the pen name "Larry Ho." The name came about when he had written his first feature article for the Times. He was signing his name, "Larry Hodgson," but his pencil broke after the first "o." The city editor, James Gray, reportedly said, "Better let it go at that–'Larry Ho.'"

He served as secretary to both St. Paul mayors Winn Powers and Vivian R. Irvin, and upon the expiration of Irvin's term, he was elected mayor by a large majority. He served two non-consecutive terms as mayor from 1918 to 1922, and from 1926 to 1930.

Hodgson also ran for governor in 1920, but came third in the race, garnering only 81,293 votes.

After Hodgson's death in 1937, his son, Laurence K. Hodgson, edited and published a book called "Howdy Folks: Selections from the Writings, Verse and Speeches of Larry Ho."

References

 Saint Paul Police Historical Society

1874 births
Mayors of Saint Paul, Minnesota
Minnesota Democrats
1937 deaths